Monsignor Richard Sykes S.J. (1854 – 8 May 1920) was the first Prefect of the Prefecture Apostolic of Zambese. He was appointed on 9 March 1915 and served until his resignation in December 1919.

External links
 Catholic Hierarchy profile

White Rhodesian people
People from Harare
1920 deaths
1854 births
Rhodesian Jesuits
19th-century Roman Catholic priests
20th-century Roman Catholic priests
Roman Catholic bishops of Harare